Mary Obering (1937 – July 29, 2022) was an American painter focusing mainly on geometric abstraction.

Early life and education 
Obering was born in Shreveport, Louisiana in 1937. When Obering was a teenager, she visited Italy for the first time – the formative trip introduced her to art and Renaissance painting, an experience that Obering said "was always in the back of [her] mind."

Obering received her BA in psychology from Hollins University in Roanoke, Virginia in 1959. Later that year, she attended graduate school for psychology at Radcliffe College, studying under noted behavioral psychologist B.F. Skinner, who taught at Harvard University at the time.

Obering then moved to New York City to work for CBS, where she studied at the Art Students League. In the mid 1960s she moved again, this time to Denver with her husband and young daughter and received an MFA from the University of Denver in 1971.

Style and technique 
Obering began in sculpture, but soon moved into painting. Her first paintings were Color Field paintings, inspired by Mark Rothko. Obering continued to work in abstraction, while incorporating techniques, such as gilded wood panels, that are reminiscent of early Italian art.  Critics have also described her work as looking like "an exotic form of sculpture."

Exhibitions
In September 2018, Obering had a solo exhibition in Los Angeles at Kayne Griffin Corcoran where she exhibited acrylic on canvas paintings from the 1970s. Obering is represented by both Kayne Griffin Corcoran in Los Angeles and Bortolami in New York.

Selected Exhibition History:
 Group:
 Denver Art Museum, 1969
 Whitney Museum of American Art, New York (Biennial), 1975
 Museum of Contemporary Art, Denver, 2002
 Robin Rule Gallery of Contemporary Art, Denver, 2003
 Solo:
 Great Western United Galleries, Denver, 1971
 University of Denver Galleries, Denver, 1971
 Artists Space, New York, 1973
 Soho Center for the Visual Arts, New York 1973
 Interart Gallery, New York, 1981
 Julian Pretto Gallery, San Jose, Costa Rica, 1983
 Jan Turner Gallery, Los Angeles, California, 1990
 Julian Pretto Gallery, New York 1990
 Plus-Kern Gallery, Brussels, Belgium 1991
 Julian Pretto Gallery, New York 1991
 Jan Turner Gallery, Los Angeles 1992
 Julian Pretto Gallery, New York 1993
 Jan Turner Gallery, Los Angeles, California, 1994
 Galerie Hugo Minnen, Antwerp, Belgium, 1994
 Littlejohn/Sternau Gallery, New York, 1995
 Primo Piano, Rome, Italy, 1996
 Robin Rule Modern and Contemporary Art, Denver, 1996
 Hugo Minnen Gallery, Antwerp, Belgium, 1997
 Robin Rule Modern and Contemporary Art, Denver, 1999
 Marfa Hotel, Marfa, Texas, 2000
 Gallery 668, Greenwich, New York, 2001
 Ninni Esposito Arte Contemporanea, Bari Italy, 2001
 Rule Modern and Contemporary Art, Denver, 2003
 Gallery 668 Greenwich, New York, 2004
 Studio G7 Bologna, Italy, 2006
 Ninni Esposito Arte Conteporanea, Bari, Italy, 2007

Personal life and death 
Obering died in New York City on July 29, 2022, at the age of 85.

References 

1937 births
2022 deaths
20th-century American women artists
21st-century American women artists
Abstract painters
American women painters
Painters from Louisiana
People from Shreveport, Louisiana